Albert-Joseph-Léon "Bob" Demuyser (Laeken, 3 September 1920 – Uccle, 15 June 2003) was a Belgian artist and racehorse owner. In his work, he had a preference for natural-looking images of horses.

Artistic career

From 1980 to 1983 

Norcliffe  – Gap of Dunloe – Sharpman – Trepan – Sharafaz – Raja Baba – Vitriolic – Étalon Anglais – Le Laboureur – Playfull River (1982) – Our Talisman – Top Command – Hawkin's Special – Shirley Heights (1982) – Cadoudal – Concertino – Assert (1982) – Is It Safe – Peire (1983) – Never have Mercy – Northern Baby (1983) – Toscanito

Signature : Demuyser

From 1984 to 1997 

Realm Sound – Gap of Dunloe – Prince Rose – Rare Stone – Northjet – Noblequest (1985) – Wouter Raphorst – Chief Singer (1985) – Hegor The Horrible – Lou Piguet – Flash of Steel – Crystal So – Mr. Paganini – Northern Sound – Master Reef – Danehill's foal – Le Labrador – Knight Moves (1993) – Daggers drawn (1997) – Garuda (Yearling) – Crying Knight – The farrier – Be My Best

Signature : Demuyser Bob

Gallery

Oil on canvas

Publications

References 
Bibliography
 Michel de Muyser, Le Parchemin, Crayon généalogique de la famille de Muyser, 1987
 Paul Piron, Dictionary of the plastician artists of Belgium in the 19 th and 20 th centuries. Edition Art of Belgium, 2003–2006
 Jean-François Houtart, OGHB, Anciennes familles de Belgique, 2008, p. 87
 Michel de Muyser Lantwyck, Autour du manoir Coeckelberghe à Vaalbeek, Le Parchemin, 2017

Notes

Turf palmarés

 

Group races (1, 2, 3 and Listed race) :
 Winner of the Grand Prix de la Ville de Nice, hippodrome de la Côte d'Azur, 1974 
 3rd of the Prix du Jockey Club, hippodrome de Chantilly, 1981 
 2d of the Grand Prix Prince Rose, hippodrome d'Ostende, 1981 
 Winner of the Prix d'Hédouville, hippodrome de Longchamp, 1982
 3rd of the Prix Jean de Chaudenay, hippodrome de Saint-Cloud, 1982 
 Winner of the Magnolia Stakes, Kempton Park Racecourse, 1998 
 2d of the Gordon Richards Stakes, Sandown Park Racecourse, 1998 
 2d of the Brigadier Gerard Stakes, Sandown Park Racecourse, 1998 
 2d of the Prix Gontaut-Biron, Deauville-La Touques Racecourse, 1998
 2d of the Preis von Europa, Cologne-Weidenpesch Racecourse, 1998

See also 
 List of Belgian painters
 List of Belgians
 Prix du Jockey Club: Assert
 Prix d'Hédouville: Gap of Dunloe
 Prix Paul de Moussac: Lou Piguet
 Prix de la Salamandre: Noblequest
 Prix du Cadran: Shafaraz
 Epsom Derby et Irish Derby: Shirley Heights
 Saratoga Special Stakes: Our Talisman
 Prince of Wales Stakes: Norcliffe 
 Champion Stakes: Northern Baby
 St. James's Palace Stakes: Chief Singer
 Grand Prix Prince Rose: Prince Rose
 Poot family, family of his mother
 de Muyser Lantwyck family

Equine artists
Artists from Brussels
Belgian racehorse owners and breeders
Belgian prisoners of war in World War II
World War II prisoners of war held by Germany
Belgian resistance members
1920 births
2003 deaths
20th-century Belgian painters